John Edmund Andrew Phillips (August 30, 1935 – March 18, 2001) was an American singer, songwriter, and guitarist. He was the leader of the vocal group the Mamas & the Papas and remains frequently referred to as Papa John Phillips. In addition to writing the majority of the group's compositions, he also wrote "San Francisco (Be Sure to Wear Flowers in Your Hair)" in 1967 for former Journeymen bandmate Scott McKenzie, as well as the oft-covered "Me and My Uncle", which was a favorite in the repertoire of the Grateful Dead. Phillips was one of the chief organizers of the 1967 Monterey Pop Festival.

Early life 
Phillips was born August 30, 1935, in Parris Island, South Carolina. His father, Claude Andrew Phillips, was a retired United States Marine Corps officer. On his way home from France following World War I, Claude Phillips managed to win a tavern located in Oklahoma from another Marine during a poker game. His mother, Edna Gertrude (née Gaines), who had English ancestry, met his father in Oklahoma. According to Phillips's autobiography, Papa John, his father was a heavy drinker who suffered from poor health. According to an article in Vanity Fair not substantiated by other sources, his biological father may have been Jewish.

Phillips grew up in Alexandria, Virginia, where he was inspired by Marlon Brando to be "street tough." From 1942 to 1946, he attended Linton Hall Military School in Bristow, Virginia. According to his autobiography, he "hated the place," citing "inspections," and "beatings," and recalls that "nuns used to watch us take showers." He formed a musical group of teenage boys, who sang doo-wop songs. He played basketball at George Washington High School, now George Washington Middle School in Alexandria, Virginia, where he graduated in 1953, and gained an appointment to the United States Naval Academy. However, he resigned during his first (plebe) year. Phillips then attended Hampden–Sydney College, a liberal arts college for men in Hampden Sydney, Virginia, dropping out in 1959.

Career

Early years 
Phillips longed to have success in the music industry and traveled to New York to gain a record contract in the early 1960s. His first band, The Journeymen, was a folk trio, with Scott McKenzie and Dick Weissman. They were fairly successful, putting out three albums, and had several appearances on the 1960s TV show Hootenanny. All three albums, as well as a compilation titled Best of the Journeymen, have since been reissued on CD. He developed his craft in Greenwich Village, during the American folk music revival, and met future Mamas & the Papas members Denny Doherty and Cass Elliot there around that time. Lyrics of the group's song "Creeque Alley" describe this period.

The Mamas and the Papas 

Phillips was the primary songwriter and musical arranger of the Mamas and the Papas. In a 1968 interview, Phillips described some of his arrangements as "well-arranged two-part harmony moving in opposite directions". After being signed to Dunhill, they had several Billboard Top Ten hits, including "California Dreamin'", "Monday, Monday", "I Saw Her Again", "Creeque Alley", and "12:30 (Young Girls Are Coming to the Canyon)".

Phillips helped promote the Monterey International Pop Music Festival held June 16 to 18, 1967, in Monterey, California; he performed with the Mamas and the Papas as part of the event as well. The festival was planned in just seven weeks, and was developed as a way to validate rock music as an art form in the way jazz and folk were regarded. It was the first major pop-rock music event in history. He also co-produced the film Monterey Pop (1968) with the group's producer Lou Adler.

John and Michelle Phillips became Hollywood celebrities, living in the Hollywood Hills and socializing with stars such as Jack Nicholson, Warren Beatty, and Roman Polanski. The Mamas and the Papas broke up in 1968 largely because Cass Elliot wanted to go solo and because of personal problems between Phillips, his wife Michelle, and Denny Doherty, including Michelle's affair with Doherty. As Michelle Phillips later recounted, "Cass confronted me and said 'I don't get it. You could have any man you want. Why would you take mine (Doherty)?'" Michelle was fired briefly in 1966 for having affairs with Gene Clark and Doherty. She was replaced for two months by Jill Gibson, their producer Lou Adler's girlfriend. Although Michelle Phillips was forgiven and asked to return to the group, the personal problems continued until the group split. Cass Elliot went on to have a successful solo career until her death in 1974.

Later years and death 
Phillips released his first solo album John, the Wolf King of L.A. in 1970. The album was not commercially successful, although it did include the minor hit "Mississippi", and Phillips began to withdraw from the limelight as his use of narcotics increased.

He teamed up with Adler again to produce Robert Altman's 1970 film Brewster McCloud and also wrote the songs for the film.

Phillips produced his third wife, Geneviève Waïte's, album, Romance Is on the Rise and wrote music for films. Between 1969 and 1974, Phillips and Waïte worked on a script and composed over 30 songs for a space-themed musical called Man on the Moon, which was eventually produced by Andy Warhol but played for just two days in New York after receiving disastrous opening night reviews.

Phillips moved to London in 1973, where Mick Jagger encouraged him to record another solo album. It was to be released on Rolling Stones Records and funded by RSR distributor Atlantic Records. Jagger and Keith Richards produced and played on the album, as well as former Stone Mick Taylor and future Stone Ronnie Wood. The project was derailed by Phillips's increasing use of cocaine and heroin, which he injected, by his own admission, "almost every fifteen minutes for two years". In 2001, the tracks of the Half Stoned or The Lost Album album were released as Pay Pack & Follow a few months after Phillips's death. In 1975 Phillips, still living in London, was commissioned to create the soundtrack to the Nicolas Roeg film The Man Who Fell to Earth, starring David Bowie. Phillips asked Mick Taylor to help out; the film was released in 1976.

In 1981, Phillips was convicted of drug trafficking. Subsequently, he and his daughter Mackenzie made the rounds in the media in an anti-drug campaign, helping to reduce his prison time to only a month in jail, of which he spent three weeks (one week off for good behavior) at Allenwood Prison Camp, in Allenwood, Pennsylvania. Upon his release, he re-formed the Mamas and the Papas with Mackenzie Phillips, Spanky McFarlane (of the group Spanky and Our Gang) and Denny Doherty. Throughout the rest of his life, Phillips toured with various incarnations of this group.

His best-selling autobiography, Papa John, was published in 1986.

With Terry Melcher, Mike Love, and former Journeymen colleague Scott McKenzie, he co-wrote the number-one single for the Beach Boys, "Kokomo". The song was used in the 1988 film Cocktail and was nominated for a Grammy Award (Best Song Written specifically for a Motion Picture or Television) and a Golden Globe Award for Best Song.

His years of drug addiction resulted in health problems that required a liver transplant in 1992. Several months later, photographs of him drinking alcohol in a bar in Palm Springs, California, were published in the National Enquirer. On March 14, 1994, during his first Howard Stern Show appearance since the transplant, he said, "Occasionally I have a drink", when asked if he still drank.

Phillips spent his last years in Palm Springs, California, with Farnaz Arassteh, his fourth wife. On March 18, 2001, he died of heart failure in Los Angeles at the age of 65, days after completing recording sessions for a new album. He is interred at Forest Lawn Cemetery in Cathedral City, near Palm Springs.

Personal life 
Phillips married Susan Adams of a wealthy Virginia family on May 7, 1957. They had a son, Jeffrey, and a daughter, Mackenzie.

While touring California with The Journeymen, Phillips met teenager Holly Michelle Gilliam, with whom he had an extramarital affair. After the affair caused the dissolution of his marriage to Adams, he married Gilliam on December 31, 1962, and she thereafter became Michelle Phillips. The couple had one child together, Chynna Phillips, vocalist of the 1990s pop trio Wilson Phillips. Denny Doherty and Michelle started an affair in 1965. Phillips and Michelle divorced in May 1969.

Phillips married his third wife, actress and model Geneviève Waïte on January 30, 1972. The couple had two children, Tamerlane and Bijou Phillips. Phillips and Waïte divorced in 1985.

Phillips married his fourth wife, artist Farnaz Arassteh, on February 3, 1995.

Abuse allegations 
In September 2009, eight years after Phillips's death, his eldest daughter Mackenzie claimed that she and her father had a 10-year abusive and incestuous relationship. In her memoir High on Arrival, Mackenzie wrote that the relationship began in 1979 when she was 19 years old. She said that the abuse began after Phillips raped her while they were both under the influence of heavy narcotics on the eve of her first marriage. On The Oprah Winfrey Show on September 23, 2009, Mackenzie Phillips said that her father injected her with cocaine and heroin. According to Phillips, the sexual abuse ended when she became pregnant and did not know who had fathered the child; she said these doubts led her to have an abortion her father paid for. She stated, "I never let him touch me again."

Geneviève Waïte, John's wife at the time, denied the allegations, saying they were inconsistent with his character. Michelle Phillips, John's second wife, also stated that she had "every reason to believe [Mackenzie's account is] untrue." Chynna Phillips, Michelle Phillips's daughter, stated that she believed Mackenzie's claims and that Mackenzie first told her about the sexual assault during a phone conversation in 1997, approximately 11 years after the events had ended. Bijou Phillips, Mackenzie's half-sister from her father's marriage to Geneviève Waïte, has stated that Mackenzie informed her of the sexual abuse when Bijou was 13 years old, and the information had a devastating effect on Bijou's teenage years, stripping her of her innocence and leaving her "wary of [her] father." She also stated, "I'm 29 now, I've talked to everyone who was around during that time, I've asked the hard questions. I do not believe my sister.  Our father [was] many things.  This is not one of them." Jessica Woods, daughter of Denny Doherty, said that her father had told her that he knew "the awful truth" and that he was "horrified at what John had done."

Awards and honors 
In 1996, a Golden Palm Star on the Palm Springs, California, Walk of Stars was dedicated to Phillips.

The Mamas and the Papas were inducted into the Rock 'n' Roll Hall of Fame on January 12, 1998, and the Vocal Group Hall of Fame in 2000.

Discography

Singles

Solo

Compilations 
 2007: Jack of Diamonds

References

Further reading 
 Cadet, Linton Hall, Linton Hall Military School Memories: One cadet's memoir, Scrounge Press, 2014, pp. 114–116.

External links 
 Papa John Phillips Official Website  Web site has been disabled!

 
 The Mamas & The Papas Online Price Guide
 
 

1935 births
2001 deaths
Dunhill Records artists
People from Parris Island, South Carolina
American expatriates in the United Kingdom
American rock singers
Burials at Forest Lawn Cemetery (Cathedral City)
Songwriters from South Carolina
American people of English descent
The Mamas and the Papas members
Musicians from Alexandria, Virginia
American folk guitarists
American male pop singers
American acoustic guitarists
American male guitarists
American rock guitarists
Incestual abuse
Guitarists from South Carolina
20th-century American guitarists
20th-century American male singers
20th-century American singers
Phillips family